Albert Papilaya (15 September 1967 – 18 April 2021) was an Indonesian boxer. He competed in the men's middleweight event at the 1992 Summer Olympics.

References

External links
 

1967 births
2021 deaths
Indonesian male boxers
Olympic boxers of Indonesia
Boxers at the 1992 Summer Olympics
Boxers at the 1998 Asian Games
Asian Games competitors for Indonesia
Middleweight boxers
Sportspeople from North Maluku
20th-century Indonesian people
21st-century Indonesian people